The Faculty of Mathematics is one of six faculties of the University of Waterloo in Waterloo, Ontario, offering more than 500 courses in mathematics, statistics and computer science. The faculty also houses the David R. Cheriton School of Computer Science, formerly the faculty's computer science department. There are more than 31,000 alumni.

History
The faculty was founded on January 1, 1967, a successor to the University of Waterloo's Department of Mathematics, which had grown to be the largest department in the Faculty of Arts under the chairmanship of Ralph Stanton (and included such influential professors as W. T. Tutte). Initially located in the Physics building, the faculty was moved in May 1968 into the newly constructed Mathematics and Computing (MC) Building. Inspired by Stanton's famously gaudy ties, the students draped a large pink tie over the MC Building on the occasion of its opening, which later became a symbol of the faculty.

At the time of its founding, the faculty included five departments: Applied Analysis and Computer Science, Applied Mathematics, Combinatorics and Optimization, Pure Mathematics, and Statistics. In 1975 the Department of Applied Analysis and Computer Science became simply the Department of Computer Science; in 2005 it became the David R. Cheriton School of Computer Science. The Statistics Department also was later renamed the Department of Statistics and Actuarial Science. The Department of Combinatorics and Optimization is the only academic department in the world devoted to combinatorics.

The second building occupied by the Mathematics faculty was the Davis Centre, which was completed in 1988. This building includes a plethora of offices, along with various lecture halls and meeting rooms. (The Davis Centre is also home to the library originally known as the Engineering, Math, and Science [EMS] Library, which was originally housed on the fourth floor of the MC building.) 

The Faculty of Mathematics finished construction of a third building, Mathematics 3 (M3), in 2011. This building now houses the Department of Statistics and Actuarial Science and a large lecture hall. An additional building, M4, has been proposed but has yet to be built.

Academics

Degrees
The Faculty of Mathematics grants the BMath (Bachelor of Mathematics) degree for most of its undergraduate programs. Computer Science undergraduates can generally choose between graduating with a BMath or a BCS (Bachelor of Computer Science) degree. The former requires more coursework in mathematics. Specialized degrees exist for the Software Engineering program (the BSE, or Bachelor of Software Engineering) and Computing and Financial Management (BCFM, or Bachelor of Computing and Financial Management). Postgraduate students are generally awarded an MMath (Master of Mathematics) or PhD.

Rankings
In the 2018 QS World University Rankings, the University of Waterloo was ranked 39th globally for Mathematics (and 3rd in Canada) and 31st globally for Computer Science (and 2nd in Canada). The University was ranked third in Canada for Mathematics and second in Canada for Computer Science in 2018 by the Maclean's University Rankings.

Student life

Students in the Faculty of Mathematics are represented by the Mathematics Society (MathSoc), which represents student interests to the university, operates the Math Coffee and Donut Shop, publishes the faculty newspaper mathNEWS, and runs student services including an exam bank and lounge space.

Pi Day is celebrated by the department in each term: on 14 March (3/14), on 22 July (22/7, Pi Approximation Day), and on 10 November (the 314th day of the year). Typical activities include throwing pie at MathSoc executives and/or popular professors, viewing mathematics-related films, competing in pi recitation contests, and eating pie (on 22/7, cake is served instead, which is approximately pie).

Tie Guard
A yearly tradition at the University of Waterloo, a group of senior math students volunteer for the position of Tie Guard each year, and are selected by the University of Waterloo Federation of Students representatives from the Faculty of Mathematics. It is expected that the appointed Tie Guard volunteers will be on hand 24 hours a day for the duration of the orientation week, to guard the Faculty's mascot (a 40-foot pink tie which hangs off the side of the building) and to provide first aid and information to incoming students.

The Tie Guard was founded in 1994 after several previous attempts on the Pink Tie resulted in both damaged mascots and injuries to students, the most notorious of which was the Tie Liberation Organization (TLO) kidnapping in 1988. In more recent years the tie guard has expanded and now several students are appointed to the Tie Guard each year. A new pink tie was draped over the Mathematics 3 Building in 2011.

Notable members

 Mark Giesbrecht, Dean
 George Alfred Barnard, Lecturer
 Walter Benz, Professor
 Jonathan Borwein , Researcher (1991–93)
 Timothy Chan, Professor
 C. B. Collins, Professor
 Gordon Cormack
 Paul Cress, Lecturer
 Kenneth Davidson , Professor
 Jack Edmonds, Professor
 Keith Geddes, Professor
 Ian Goldberg, Assistant Professor
 Ian Goulden , Professor
 Peter Ladislaw Hammer, Professor
 Hiroshi Haruki, Professor (1966–86)
 Ric Holt, Professor
 David Jackson , Professor
 Srinivasan Keshav, Associate Professor; Sloan Fellowship (1997–99)
 Murray Klamkin, Professor
 Neal Koblitz, Professor
 Kenneth Mackenzie, Professor
 Alfred Menezes, Professor
 Crispin Nash-Williams, Professor
 Josef Paldus , Professor (1968–2001)
 Vladimir Platonov, Professor (1993–2001); Humboldt Prize (1993)
 Ronald Read, Professor
 Jeffrey Shallit, Professor
 Doug Stinson, Professor
 W. T. Tutte , Professor (1962–85); CRM-Fields-PIMS Prize (2001)
 Scott Vanstone , Professor

References

External links

Faculty of Mathematics website
Mathematics Society of the University of Waterloo (MathSoc)

1967 establishments in Ontario
Waterloo
Faculty of Mathematics
Research institutes in Canada